Will Vinton's Claymation Christmas Celebration is an animated Christmas television special originally broadcast on the American CBS TV network on December 21, 1987.  The special featured stop motion clay animation and was produced and directed by Will Vinton. The special debuted alongside A Garfield Christmas and the two continued to be aired back to back in subsequent years.

Synopsis
The special is co-hosted by Rex (Johnny Counterfit), an erudite Tyrannosaurus rex, and Herb (Tim Conner), a dimwitted and bespectacled Styracosaurus with a gluttonous appetite. The two appeared in previous Will Vinton videos dating back to 1980 including Dinosaur, but this Christmas special is the first in which they have dialogue and contemporary personalities, vaguely parodying Siskel and Ebert respectively. 

Situated in a facsimile of London's Christmas Square, Rex and Herb introduce several stand-alone videos of Christmas carols and holiday standards and discuss the origins of each song relating to different holiday traditions around the world.

Among the musical performances:
 The Biblical magi sing the verses of "We Three Kings" traditionally, while their camels sing the chorus in the style of doo-wop.
At Notre Dame Cathedral, The Paris Bell-Harmonic, a group of anthropomorphic church bells who strike their own heads with chime hammers to achieve their respective notes, performs "Carol of the Bells." The low C bell (the tonic) constantly dawdles and chimes out of tune, enraging the maestro, Quasimodo, who uses a slingshot on the bell to get the proper tone at the end.
 A children's choir sings "O Christmas Tree", with the video depicting various scenes taking place inside of Christmas ornaments
 "Angels We Have Heard On High" is set to a walrus couple doing an interpretive ice ballet while several luckless penguins watch.
 At a black church in the countryside, a soul/jazz hybrid rendition of "Joy to the World" plays out in colorful scenes. (This segment, using stylized, flat animation resembling paintings and stained glass windows, is the only segment not rendered in Vinton's trademark Claymation.) 
 The California Raisins perform a cover of the Temptations' version of "Rudolph the Red-Nosed Reindeer,".

Throughout the program, Rex futilely attempts to clarify the true pronunciation and meaning of the term "wassail', featured in the Christmas carol "Here We Come A-Wassailing".  As the show progresses, Rex is accosted by different groups, all singing parodies of the song.

 "Here We Come A-Waffling", by a kennel of dogs selling waffles from a vendor's wagon.
 "Here We Come A-Waddling", by a gaggle of straggling geese carrying baskets of goodies.
 "Here We Come A-Wallowing", by a herd of slovenly pigs on a John Deere-style field wagon gorging themselves on an abundance of assorted fruits.

Rex is convinced that his own pronunciation is correct, but he is continually questioned by the others including Herb when he is not busy excessively partaking of the various Christmas treats offered by each group; consulting the dictionary provides no meaningful help.  Finally, near the program's end, a large truck loaded with cider-swilling Irish elves arrives in Christmas Square singing the correct version of the carol, validating Rex's theory much to his delight. When asked, one of the townies explains the real meaning of wassailing: going around the neighborhood singing Christmas carols, and getting treats and cordials. 

At the end, the entire cast performs "Here We Come A-Wassailing", and then "We Wish You a Merry Christmas" as the end credits roll.

Production
Filming took place in Portland, Oregon.

Awards
1988—Primetime Emmy Award for Outstanding Animated Program given to Will Vinton (executive producer/director), David Altschul (producer) and Ralph Liddle (writer)

Soundtrack and video
A companion soundtrack album was released by Atlantic Records in 1988 and was originally available on LP, cassette, and compact disc.  The album contains six songs not featured on the special, including an alternate version of "Angels We Have Heard On High".  The song "O Christmas Tree", as featured in the special, was excluded from the soundtrack.

The special was released on the Hen's Tooth Video DVD Will Vinton's Claymation Christmas Plus Halloween & Easter Celebrations in 2003.

Track List:
 Rudolph the Red Nosed Reindeer
 Good King Swing
 We Three Kings Bop
 God Rest Ye
 Carol of the Bells
 Silent Night Jazzy Night
 Noel
 Hark!
 Up on the Housetop
 Joy!
 Waffle, Waddle, Wallow, Wassail
 Angels We Have Heard On High

See also
 List of Christmas films

References

External links
 
 

1980s American television specials
1987 in American television
1987 television specials
Christmas television specials
1980s animated television specials
CBS television specials
Clay animation
Emmy Award-winning programs
Stop-motion animated films
Films shot in Portland, Oregon
American Christmas television specials
Animated Christmas television specials